Cheshmeh Valad is a village in Chaharduli Rural District, in the Central District of Asadabad County, Hamadan Province, Iran. At the 2006 census, its population was 54, made up of 14 families.

References 

Populated places in Asadabad County